Jeet is a 1996 Indian Hindi-language romantic action thriller film directed and written by Raj Kanwar, with production by Sajid Nadiadwala. The film stars Sunny Deol, Salman Khan and Karishma Kapoor  as leads; Amrish Puri, Tabu, Alok Nath, Dalip Tahil and Johnny Lever appear in supporting roles. The story is heavily inspired from Muqaddar Ka Sikandar (1978) where Deol, Khan and Kapoor's roles were portrayed by Amitabh Bachchan, Vinod Khanna and Raakhee respectively. Released on 23 August 1996, Jeet was a critical and commercial success and went on to become the 4th highest grossing Bollywood film of 1996. Budgeted at 59 million, the film accumulated a gross collection of 290 million, including both domestic and overseas markets. After its success, it was remade in Dhallywood in 1999 as Laal Baadshah featuring Manna,  Sardika Parvin Popy and Rachana Banerjee & in Odia in 2008 as Munna-A Love Story starring Anubhav Mohanty and Naina Das.

Plot

Kajal (Karisma Kapoor) is the innocent, virtuous and righteous daughter of Professor Sidhant Sharma (Alok Nath). On the other end of the spectrum, Karan (Sunny Deol) is a criminal working for Gajraj Chaudhry (Amrish Puri). The film starts with Gajraj ordering Karan to kill a journalist for writing negative things about him (Gajraj), which Karan dutifully does - in a marketplace full of people (including Kajal and her father). Kajal's father reports the crime. Karan finds out and breaks into Kajal and Sidhant's home - presumably to kill Sidhant - and starts beating him up. In a desperate attempt to get him to stop, Kajal slaps Karan. They make eye contact, visibly entrancing him, and he leaves their home.

Karan goes to Tulsi (Tabu), who works as a prostitute (and is in love with Karan). There, it is shown that he is unable to forget Kajal, or more specifically, her eyes. Karan starts stalking Kajal, and she starts getting creeped out. One day, as Kajal is leaving the temple, he corners her. Kajal feels disgraced and lashes out at him, criticizing his behavior, and saying that he feels simply lust for her. Karan feels disgusted by this and leaves.

Karan is then shown to have a soft side when he saves a child - named Timepass - from being mistreated by customers at a bar. Being reminded of himself (in that Timepass is revealed to be an orphan and has no other choice than to work), Karan decides to take the kid in.

The next time we see Kajal, she and some other women are on a bus. They get harassed, and Karan steps in to save them. Kajal, after seeing his courage and helpful nature, starts to fall for Karan. She befriends Timepass, from whom she gets to know more about Karan. She approaches him with the help of Timepass, and starts to meet him regularly. She realizes that he's had a tough life and had gone down the wrong path. With encouragement from Kajal, Karan leaves his criminal life behind to be with Kajal. When he tells Tulsi about him and Kajal, she is heartbroken but decides to remain his friend.

Raju (Salman Khan) is then introduced as the son of Sidhant's childhood friend Ramakant Sahaye (Dalip Tahil). He is portrayed as a happy-go-lucky, with a flirtatious nature. It's revealed that Ramakant and Sidhant had had a pact, wherein Kajal and Raju would get married. Kajal finds out about this through her father. She promptly confesses her love for Karan and refuses to marry Raju. Sidhant suffers from a major heart attack when he learns this. To reiterate, Kajal is righteous. She considers marrying Raju her duty toward her father and agrees to marry Raju. Karan finds out goes to Kajal's house to beg for her love, but Kajal rejects him and asks him to forget her.

Kajal marries Raju (it is important to note that Karan doesn't know that Kajal is married to Raju; he just knows that she's married to someone). Karan fails to prevent the marriage and returns to a criminal lifestyle. 

With time, Kajal falls in love with Raju as well. They return to India after the honeymoon, where Kajal finds out that she's pregnant after fainting when she overhears Raju and his father's argument about their illegal affairs. She, however, is unhappy that their child will grow up in a criminal environment. Raju admits that he did not know about his father's deeds, and he and Kajal decide to leave Ramakant's house to provide their child with a safe environment to grow up in.
 
Gajraj then worries that Raju might become a danger to his business, and orders Karan to kill Raju. Karan travels to Raju's house to kill him. There he comes across Kajal and learns the truth, deciding to protect Raju at all costs for Kajal's sake. 

One fateful day, Raju is attacked by some hitmen and is rescued by Karan, who takes Raju home. Raju wakes up from his unconscious state in the nick of time to overhear Kajal apologizing to Karan for how she treated him. Raju is understanding of their situation and respects Kajal's past love for Karan. He also praises Kajal's fulfillment of her 'dharma' towards him. He promises Karan that if their child turns out to be a boy, they'll name him after Karan.

We enter the climax of the movie when Raju, Kajal and Karan are attacked by Gajraj's goons when Kajal suffers from labour pains. Karan, noticing this, takes Raju and Kajal to Tulsi's brothel, asking Tulsi's help in delivering the child safely. The goons (with Gajraj in tow) chase them all the way to the brothel, forcing Karan and Raju to indulge in a fight with them. Towards the end of the fight, Gajaraj is just about to shoot Raju when Karan steps in and takes the shots himself. Timepass (who was also there, by the way) then gives Karan a gun, and he shoots Gajraj with it, killing him. Karan dies at the exact moment that Kajal delivers her baby. The film ends with Raju holding their son, whom Kajal calls out to with the name 'Karan'.

Cast
 Sunny Deol as Karan
 Salman Khan as Rajnath "Raju" Sahay
 Karishma Kapoor as Kajal Sharma Sahay
 Tabu as Tulsibai
 Amrish Puri as Gajraj , Rajnath’s maternal uncle.
 Dalip Tahil as Ramakant "Rama" Sahay, Rajnath’s father.
 Alok Nath as Prof. Sidhant Sharma
 Ashish Vidyarthi as Inspector Omendra Dholakia
 Master Mohsin as Timepass
 Johnny Lever as Piajee
 Mohan Joshi as Pitamber
 Arun Khedwal as Prateek
 Mahavir Bhullar as Gajjan
 Deepak Shirke as Goverdhan

Soundtrack
The film score was composed by soundtrack is composed by Koti, while the songs featured in the film were composed by Nadeem-Shravan. Singers Kumar Sanu, Alka Yagnik, Udit Narayan, Kavita Krishnamurthy, Vinod Rathod, Sonu Nigam and Sadhna Sargam lent their voices. The whole soundtrack became very popular, especially "Yaara O Yaara" and "Tu Dharti Pe Chahe". It is worth mentioning here that the song "Dil Ka Kya Karen Saheb" was hugely inspired from, though not officially mentioned, Ustaad Nusrat Fateh Ali Khan's "Maikadah Vol. 15" track "Dil pe zakham khate hain".

Box office

Made on a budget of 5.90 crore, Jeet earned a net collection of 16.13 crore. The worldwide gross of the film was 29 crore. It was declared a Super Hit and became the 4th highest grossing Bollywood film of 1996.

Accolades
42nd Filmfare Awards
 Best Supporting Actress - Tabu (Nominated)

Screen Awards
 Screen Award for Best Supporting Actor - Salman Khan (Nominated)

Screen Awards
best actor Sunny Deol  (nominated)

References

External links
 

1996 films
1996 action thriller films
Indian romantic thriller films
Indian action thriller films
1990s Hindi-language films
Films scored by Nadeem–Shravan
Films scored by Koti
Hindi films remade in other languages
1990s romantic thriller films
Films directed by Raj Kanwar